Saint Mary of the Snows, also Our Lady of the Snows and Saint Mary Major, may refer to:

Dedication 
 Dedication of the Basilica of St Mary Major, a liturgical feast day previously known in Latin as Dedicatio Sanctæ Mariæ ad Nives, translating as "Dedication of the Church of Our Lady of the Snows", in 1969

Buildings

Churches
 Cathedral of Our Lady of the Snows, Nuoro, Sardinia, Italy
 Chapel of Our Lady of the Snows (Belgrano II Base), Argentine Antarctica
 Chapel of Our Lady of the Snows (Ilha de Maré), Brazil
 St. Mary on the Snow, a church in the historical city center of Prague, Czech Republic
 A neoclassical chapel of Our Lady of the Snows in Prior Park College, Bath, England
 Notre-Dame des Neiges, L'Alpe d'Huez, France
 Our Lady of the Snows Parish Church, Budapest, Hungary
 Santa Maria Maggiore (disambiguation), several churches in Italy
 Our Lady of the Snows, Quarantoli, Modena, Italy
 Knisja tal-Madonna tas-Silġ, near the nearby ancient site of Tas-Silġ, Malta
 Our Lady of the Snows Parish, El Salvador, Misamis Oriental, Philippines
 Our Lady of the Snows convent church in Przeworsk, Poland
 Saint Mary of the Snows Church, Reșița, Caraş-Severin, Romania                                *Our Lady of Snows Niinzi Sub parish church Matale Parish Masaka Diocese Uganda East Africa

Schools
 Our Lady of the Snows, in Methven, New Zealand
 Our Lady of the Snows School, a school in the Roman Catholic Archdiocese of Chicago, Illinois, US
 St. Mary of the Snow (school), in Saugerties, New York, US

Basilicas
 Basilica of Our Lady of the Snows, Iguape, Brazil
 Basilica of Our Lady of Snows, Pallippuram, Ernakulam, India
 Basilica of Our Lady of Snows, Thoothukudi, Tamil Nadu, India

Shrines
 Shrine of Our Lady of the Snows in Tekije, Petrovaradin, Serbia
 National Shrine of Our Lady of the Snows, Belleville, Illinois, US

Other buildings
 Notre Dame des Neiges Cemetery, in Montreal, Quebec, Canada
 Abbey of Notre-Dame des Neiges, a Trappist monastery in Ardèche, France

Other uses
 Notre-Dame-des-Neiges, a town in Quebec, Canada
 Santa Maria Maggiore, Piedmont, a municipality in northern Italy
 "Our Lady of the Snows", an 1897 poem by Rudyard Kipling, included in his 1903 collection The Five Nations
 Pulsatilla vernalis, an alpine plant